The 1992 Waveney District Council election took place on 7 May 1992 to elect members of Waveney District Council in England. This was on the same day as other local elections.

Summary

Ward results

Beccles Town

Beccles Worlingham

Bungay

Carlton

Carlton Colville

Gunton

Halesworth

Harbour

Kessingland

Kirkley

Normanston

Oulton Broad

Pakefield

Southwold

St. Margaret's

Whitton

References

1992 English local elections
May 1992 events in the United Kingdom
1992
1990s in Suffolk